Madera Municipal Airport  is three miles northwest of Madera, in Madera County, California. The FAA's National Plan of Integrated Airport Systems for 2011–2015 categorized it as a general aviation facility.

Facilities
It has two asphalt runways: 12/30 is 5,545 by 150 feet (1,690 x 46 m) and 7/25 is 3,702 by 150 feet (1,128 x 46 m).

In the year ending November 18, 2015 the airport had 50,950 aircraft operations, average 139 per day: 96% general aviation, 1% air taxi, and <1% military. In May 2017, 140 aircraft were based at this airport: 99 single-engine, 13 multi-engine, 10 jet, 8 helicopter, 1 glider, and 9 ultralight.

History
In 1943 the City of Madera leased the airport to the Army Corps of Engineers to be used by the Army Air Force for fueling planes flying north to south. Six months after the end of the war, the land reverted to the city.

References

External links 
 Aerial photo as of 18 August 1998 from USGS The National Map
 

Airports in Madera County, California
San Joaquin Valley